The 1934 Irish local elections were held in all the counties, cities and towns of Ireland in 1934. The election was the first test for Fine Gael, which had been formed in September 1933.  Fianna Fáil won majorities in fifteen councils while Fine Gael won majorities in eight.

Results

Detailed results

References

See also 
Local government in the Republic of Ireland

Local
Council elections in the Republic of Ireland